Oda Sessō (小田 雪窓, 1901–1966) was a Rinzai Rōshi and abbot of the Daitoku-ji (大徳寺) in Kyoto, Japan, a Dharma successor of Gotō Zuigan.  He was elected abbot of Daitoku-ji upon Goto's retirement from that post in 1955.  At Goto's request, Oda opened Daitoku-ji to foreigners.  His western students included Gary Snyder, Janwillem van de Wetering, Irmgard Schloegl, and Philip Yampolsky.

Snyder described him as  

Alan Watts said, 

Janwillem van de Wetering gave an account of his stay at Daitoku-ji in his book "The empty mirror".

See also
Buddhism in Japan
List of Rinzai Buddhists

References

Sources
Kraft, Kenneth; Morinaga, Sōkō. Zen, Tradition and Transition (1988) Grove Press. 
Kyger, Joanne. Strange Big Moon: The Japan and India Journals: 1960-1964 (2000) North Atlantic Books. 
Snyder, Gary. The Real Work: Interviews & Talks, 1964-1979 (1980) New Directions Publishing. 
Stirling, Isabel. Zen Pioneer: The Life & Works of Ruth Fuller Sasaki (2006)  Shoemaker & Hoard.

Further reading
 Janwillem van de Wetering, The empty mirror

1901 births
1966 deaths
Rinzai Buddhists
Zen Buddhist priests
Japanese Zen Buddhists